Inga Rodionova (born 22 March 1980) is a former pair skater who competed internationally for Azerbaijan. With partner Aleksandr Anichenko, she placed 18th at the 1998 Winter Olympics. That partnership dissolved in 1999 and Rodionova then teamed up with Andrei Krukov. With him, she competed internationally for two seasons, placing as high as 8th at the European Figure Skating Championships.

Results 
(for Azerbaijan)

With Krukov

With Anichenko

References

External links 
 

Azerbaijani figure skaters
Russian female pair skaters
Olympic figure skaters of Azerbaijan
Figure skaters at the 1998 Winter Olympics
1980 births
Figure skaters from Saint Petersburg
Living people